This article is a list of heads of state who have survived assassination attempts. Many notable heads of government have been survivors of assassination attempts.

List

Gallery

See also

 List of assassinated persons
 List of people who survived assassination attempts
 List of assassination attempts on prime ministers of India
 List of United States presidential assassination attempts and plots

Notes and references

Lists of assassinations
Assassination attempts, survived
Lists of survivors